Sounds of Summer: The Very Best of The Beach Boys is a greatest hits album of the American rock band the Beach Boys, released on June 10, 2003 by Capitol Records. The original collection was the most comprehensive single-disc compilation of the band's music, with 30 tracks including nearly every U.S. Top 40 hit of their career, except for "The Little Girl I Once Knew" (1965) and "It's OK" (1976).

On June 17, 2022, foreshadowing the band's 60th anniversary celebration, Capitol released an expanded three-disc edition of the compilation, including newly-remastered (and, in some cases, remixed) versions of the classic tracks. It received a mixed to negative response on Beach Boys fan forums. Some of the new mixes were deemed "flat-out unlistenable" and the overall sound quality described as "brittle" and "almost offensively bad."

Release and reissues
Sounds of Summer: The Very Best of The Beach Boys was released into a market already containing numerous Beach Boys compilations, including three Greatest Hits volumes: Volume 1: 20 Good Vibrations (1995), Volume 2: 20 More Good Vibrations (1999), and Volume Three: Best of the Brother Years 1970–1986 (2000). Nevertheless, Sounds of Summer reached number 16 on the US charts (their highest peak since 15 Big Ones in 1976), and had a lengthy 104-week stay. Currently certified triple platinum, The Very Best of The Beach Boys: Sounds of Summer was re-issued with a DVD component in 2004 with the regular edition remaining available.

In 2007, a follow-up album, The Warmth of the Sun, was released which contains other fan favorites and hits that were not included on Sounds of Summer.

In 2011, Mike Love stated, "Sounds of Summer: The Very Best of The Beach Boys is fast approaching selling three million copies – if it's triple-platinum, which is, you know, pretty good. And by the time this 50th celebration is over, it'll probably be more than triple-platinum."

The album was re-released on February 7, 2012 as the Celebration Merch Set which featured the original CD along with a T-shirt celebrating the band's 50th anniversary.

2022 remix and remaster 
A three-disc expanded edition of the compilation was released on June 17, 2022, as part of the band's 60th anniversary, and contains 50 additional (previously released) Beach Boys songs. The reissue was curated by Mark Linett and Alan Boyd.

The collection features 24 new mixes including two first-time stereo mixes, as well as 22 "new and improved" stereo mixes, based on a new digital stereo technology, allowing for a separation the original mono backing tracks for the first time. The new edition is available on three CDs or six vinyl records. All tracks from the original Sounds of Summer album were included in a new Dolby Atmos remix on the expanded Sounds of Summer.

Track listing

2003 – Original release

2004 – Bonus DVD

DVD: Sights of Summer
 "Surfin' U.S.A." (Live on the T.A.M.I. Show, 1964)
 "I Get Around" (Live on the T.A.M.I. Show, 1964)
 "Surfer Girl" (Live on the T.A.M.I. Show, 1964)
 "Dance, Dance, Dance" (Live on the T.A.M.I. Show, 1964)
 "Little Deuce Coupe" (Live from the Lost Concert, 1964)
 "Sloop John B" (Promotional Video, 1966)
 "Pet Sounds promo film" (1966)
 "God Only Knows" (Live montage, 1967 & 1968)
 "Good Vibrations" (Live on The Ed Sullivan Show, 1968)
 "Do It Again" (Live on The Ed Sullivan Show, 1968)

2022 – Expanded edition

Charts

Weekly charts

Year-end charts

References

2003 greatest hits albums
The Beach Boys compilation albums
2004 video albums
Capitol Records compilation albums
Capitol Records video albums